Mikki Padilla (born May 27, 1974) is an American actress, model, writer and author.  She has since filmed several projects, commercials, and her book, Been There, Done That... now doing MORE! was released in March 2013. She was the co-host and dealer of the GSN game show Catch 21.

Early life and start 
Padilla born in Denver, Colorado to Evie and Ernie Padilla. When Padilla was four, her parents moved to Santa Fe, New Mexico, but by the time she was in sixth grade, her parents divorced, but were still friends. Her stepfather, Cristobal Chavez, also became friends with her father. She started her acting career in the 2001 Japanese movie Seance. After she appeared in the movie, she started rising to fame. She got small television and movie roles. She was a model for Avon, and was the brand's top 5 Latina model.

Literature/publications 
Been There, Done That... now doing MORE! (2013)

Filmography

References

External links

1974 births
Actresses from New Mexico
American female models
American film actresses
American television actresses
Game show models
Living people
Actors from Santa Fe, New Mexico
Place of birth missing (living people)
Writers from Santa Fe, New Mexico
Actresses from Denver
University of New Mexico alumni
American non-fiction writers
21st-century American women